KZAH (99.1 FM) is a Red dirt country formatted broadcast radio station.  The station is licensed to Harper, Texas and serves Harper, Kerrville, and Fredericksburg in Texas.  KZAH is owned and operated by JAM Broadcasting, LLC.

On January 8, 2023 KZAH changed their format from adult hits (which moved to KAXA 103.7 FM Mountain Home) to Texas/Red Dirt country, branded as "99.1 The Buck".

Previous logo

References

External links

2018 establishments in Texas
Country radio stations in the United States
Radio stations established in 2018
ZAH